The Minister for Government Coordination is a cabinet minister within the Swedish government who is appointed by the Prime Minister of Sweden.

The minister is responsible for coordinating the government and being the Prime Minister's courier to the other ministries. The last minister for Government Coordination was Ibrahim Baylan, whose term ended on 21 January 2019.

List of officeholders 

Government ministers of Sweden